Newsday is an American daily newspaper that primarily serves Nassau and Suffolk counties on Long Island, although it is also sold throughout the New York metropolitan area. The slogan of the newspaper is "Newsday, Your Eye on LI", and formerly it was "Newsday, the Long Island Newspaper". The newspaper's headquarters is in Melville, New York, in Suffolk County. Newsday has won 19 Pulitzer Prizes and has been a finalist for 20 more.

As of 2019, its weekday circulation of 250,000 was the 8th-highest in the United States, and the highest among suburban newspapers. By January 2014, Newsdays total average circulation was 437,000 on weekdays, 434,000 on Saturdays and 495,000 on Sundays. As of June 2022, the paper had an average print circulation of 97,182.

History
Founded by Alicia Patterson and her husband, Harry Guggenheim, the publication was first produced on September 3, 1940 from Hempstead. For many years until a major redesign in the 1970s, Newsday copied the Daily News format of short stories and numerous pictures. (Ironically, Patterson was fired as a writer at her father's Daily News in her early 20s, after getting the basic facts of a divorce wrong in a published report.) After Patterson's death in 1963, Guggenheim became publisher and editor.

In 1967, Guggenheim turned over the publisher position to Bill Moyers and continued as president and editor-in-chief. But Guggenheim was disappointed by the liberal drift of the newspaper under Moyers, criticizing what he called the "left-wing" coverage of Vietnam War protests.  The two split over the 1968 presidential election, with Guggenheim signing an editorial supporting Richard Nixon, when Moyers supported Hubert Humphrey.

Guggenheim sold his majority share to the then-conservative Times-Mirror Company over the attempt of newspaper employees to block the sale, even though Moyers offered $10 million more than the Times-Mirror purchase price; Moyers resigned a few days later.  Guggenheim, who died a year later, disinherited Moyers from his will.

After the competing Long Island Press (not to be confused with the alternative weekly of the same name) ceased publication in 1977, Newsday launched a separate Queens edition, followed by a New York City edition dubbed New York Newsday. In June 2000, Times Mirror merged with the Tribune Company, partnering Newsday with the New York City television station WPIX (Channel 11), also owned by Tribune.

With the Times Mirror-Tribune merger, the newspaper founded by Alicia Patterson was now owned by the company that was founded by her great-grandfather, Joseph Medill — which owns the Chicago Tribune and, until 1991, also owned her father's Daily News. (Tribune sold the Daily News to British newspaper magnate Robert Maxwell. After Maxwell's death in 1992, his publishing empire collapsed and Mortimer Zuckerman purchased the Daily News.) Chicago, Illinois, real estate magnate Samuel Zell purchased Tribune in 2007.

News Corporation, headed by CEO Rupert Murdoch, attempted to purchase Newsday for US$580 million in April 2008. This was soon followed by a matching bid from Zuckerman and a $680 million bid from Cablevision. In May 2008, News Corporation withdrew its bid, and on May 12, 2008, Newsday reported that Cablevision would purchase the paper for $650 million. The sale was completed July 29, 2008.

Altice
Altice, a Netherlands-based multinational telecoms company, bought Cablevision, including Newsday and News 12 in 2016. However, Altice then sold a majority (75%) stake in Newsday back to Cablevision's former owner Charles Dolan and his son Patrick, making Patrick the CEO of Newsday. Altice disposed of its remaining stake in Newsday at the end of July 2018, which, combined with Charles Dolan's transfer of shares to son Patrick, makes Patrick the sole owner of Newsday.

Newsday received $10 million in federal loans by July 2020 from Paycheck Protection Program during the COVID-19 pandemic to pay salaries for 500 jobs.

Editorial style
Despite having a tabloid format, Newsday is not known for being sensationalistic, as are other local daily tabloids, such as the New York Daily News and the New York Post.  This causes Newsday to sometimes be referred to as "the respectable tabloid".

In 2004, the alternative weekly newspaper Long Island Press (which is not related to the defunct daily of the same name) wrote that Newsday has used its clout to influence local politics in Nassau and Suffolk Counties.

Bill Moyers briefly served as publisher. During the tenure of publisher Robert M. Johnson in the 1980s, Newsday made a major push into New York City. The paper's roster of columnists and critics has included Cathy Young, Jimmy Breslin, Barbara Garson, Normand Poirier, Murray Kempton, Gail Collins, Pete Hamill, Sydney Schanberg, Robert Reno (died 2012), Jim Dwyer, sportswriter Mike Lupica, music critic Tim Page, and television critic Marvin Kitman. The paper featured both advice columnists Ann Landers and Dear Abby for several years.  From 1985 to 2005, Michael Mandelbaum wrote a regular foreign affairs analysis column for Newsday. Noted writer and biographer Robert Caro was an investigative reporter. Its features section has included, among others, television reporters Verne Gay and Diane Werts, TV/film feature writer Frank Lovece, and film critic Rafer Guzman. Newsday carries the syndicated columnist Froma Harrop. Pulitzer Prize winner Walt Handelsman's editorial political cartoons animation are a nationally syndicated feature of Newsday. In the 1980s, a new design director, Robert Eisner, guided the transition into digital design and color printing. 

Newsday created and sponsored a "Long Island at the Crossroads" advisory board in 1978, to recommend regional goals, supervise local government, and liaison with state and Federal officials.
It lasted approximately a decade.

On March 21, 2011, Newsday redesigned its front page, scrapping the nameplate and font used since the 1960s in favor of a sans-serif wordmark.

Circulation
In 2008, Newsday was ranked 10th in terms of newspaper circulation in the United States.

A circulation scandal in 2004 revealed that the paper's daily and Sunday circulation had been inflated by 16.9% and 14.5%, respectively, in the auditing period September 30, 2002 to September 30, 2003. The Audit Bureau of Circulation adjusted average weekday circulation to 481,816 from 579,599; average Saturday circulation to 392,649 from 416,830; and average Sunday circulation to 574,081 from 671,820, and instituted twice-yearly audits.
 
On October 28, 2009, Newsday changed its web site to a paid-subscriber only model. Newsday.com would open its front page, classified ads, movie listings, and school closings to all site visitors, but access beyond this content would require a weekly fee – US$5 as of 2010. This fee would be waived for subscribers of the print edition of the paper, as well as for subscribers to parent-company Cablevision's Internet service. Through its first three months only 35 non-Optimum, non-Newsday subscribers signed up for the paid web site.

Pulitzer Prize
Newsday has won 19 Pulitzer Prizes and has been a finalist for 20 additional (if no individual is listed, award is for Newsday staff):

 1954: Public Service (Winner)
 1970: Public Service (Winner)
 1970: Editorial Cartooning (Winner) — Thomas F. Darcy
 1974: Public Service (Winner)
 1974: Criticism (Winner) — Emily Genauer, Newsday Syndicate
 1980: Local Investigative Specialized Reporting (Finalist)  — Carole E. Agus, Andrew V. Fetherston Jr. and Frederick J. Tuccillo
 1982: International Reporting (Finalist) — Bob Wyrick
 1982: Criticism (Finalist) — Marvin Kitman
 1984: Local General or Spot News Reporting (Winner)
 1984: International Reporting (Finalist) — Morris Thompson
 1984: Criticism (Finalist) — Dan Cryer
 1985: International Reporting (Winner) — Josh Friedman, Dennis Bell, and Ozier Muhammad
 1985: Commentary (Winner) — Murray Kempton
 1986: Feature Writing (Finalist) — Irene Virag 
 1989: Investigative Reporting (Finalist) — Penny Loeb
 1990: Specialized Reporting (Finalist) – Jim Dwyer
 1991: Spot News Reporting (Finalist)
 1991: Spot News Photography (Finalist)
 1992: Spot News Reporting (Winner)
 1992: International Reporting (Winner) — Patrick J. Sloyan
 1993: International Reporting (Winner) — Roy Gutman
 1994: Explanatory Journalism (Finalist)
 1995: Investigative Reporting (Winner) — Brian Donovan and Stephanie Saul
 1995: Commentary (Winner) — Jim Dwyer
 1996: Explanatory Journalism (Winner) — Laurie Garrett
 1996: Beat Reporting (Winner) — Bob Keeler
 1996: International Reporting (Finalist) — Laurie Garrett
 1997: Spot News Reporting (Winner)
 1998: Beat Reporting (Finalist) — Laurie Garrett
 1999: Criticism (Finalist) — Justin Davidson
 1999: Editorial Writing (Finalist) — Lawrence C. Levy
 2002: Criticism (Winner) — Justin Davidson
 2004: Breaking News Reporting (Finalist)
 2005: International Reporting (Winner) — Dele Olojede
 2005: Explanatory Reporting (Finalist)
 2007: Editorial Cartooning (Winner) — Walt Handelsman
 2008: Public Service (Finalist) — Jennifer Barrios, Sophia Chang, Michael R. Ebert, Reid J. Epstein, Jennifer Sinco Kelleher, Eden Laikin, Herbert Lowe, Joseph Mallia, Jennifer Maloney, Luis Perez and Karla Schuster
 2013: Editorial Writing (Finalist) — Editorial Board staff
 2014: Public Service (Finalist)

In popular culture
 In the 1985 comedy/thriller Compromising Positions, the lead character, played by Susan Sarandon, is a former Newsday journalist who is trying reestablish her career by selling a freelance story to the publication.
 On the 1996–2005 CBS sitcom Everybody Loves Raymond, the fictional character Ray Barone (played by Ray Romano) is employed by Newsday as a sportswriter.
 The lead female character in the Crocodile Dundee films works at Newsday.
 The episode "The Homer They Fall" in season eight of The Simpsons quotes Newsday calling boxing "the cruelest sport".
 Naked Came the Stranger is a 1969 novel written as a literary hoax poking fun at contemporary American culture. Although credited to "Penelope Ashe", it was in fact written by a group of twenty-four journalists led by Newsday columnist Mike McGrady. McGrady's intention was to write a deliberately terrible book with a lot of sex, to illustrate the point that popular American literary culture had become mindlessly vulgar. The book fulfilled the authors' expectations and became a bestseller in 1969; they revealed the hoax later that year, further spurring the book's popularity.
Former editor Howard Schneider appears in the documentary Three Identical Strangers to discuss Newsday's coverage of three young men who discovered they were separated as infants.

References

External links

Newsday.com
2001 interview with Pulitzer Prize winning journalist Dennis Duggan   Leon Charney on the Leon Charney Report

Daily newspapers published in New York (state)
N
Pulitzer Prize-winning newspapers
Huntington, New York
Newspapers established in 1940
2008 mergers and acquisitions
Pulitzer Prize for Public Service winners
1940 establishments in New York (state)